Mary Manson Dreaver  (née Bain, 31 March 1887 – 19 July 1961) was a New Zealand politician of the Labour Party.

Biography

Early life
She was born in Dunedin, the oldest of 13 children of Alexander Manson Bain and Hanna Kiely. She married Andrew James Dreaver in 1911. She was a minister and president of the National Spiritualist Church of New Zealand, a journalist as Maorilander in the New Zealand Woman's Weekly, and a broadcaster on Radio 1ZB as Aunt Maisy. In 1934 she became the first woman minister appointed by the church in New Zealand.

Political career

In 1931 she was elected to the Auckland Hospital Board as a Labour candidate. In 1933 a visit by her to the hospital kitchen and claims of long hours and "sweated labour" there aroused controversy on the board.

In 1940 she stood for the Labour nomination at the Auckland West by-election following the death of Prime Minister Michael Joseph Savage, but lost to Peter Carr.

In 1941 she won the Waitemata electorate when a by-election was held after the death of the previous Labour Party MP, Jack Lyon. She was defeated in the next (1943) general election, by the National Party candidate, Henry Thorne Morton.

She was the third woman to be elected to Parliament after Elizabeth McCombs and Catherine Stewart and the first woman from Auckland. She also was on several Auckland local bodies. She was a member of the Auckland Hospital Board from 1933 to 1944 and again from 1950 to 1956, the Auckland Transport Board from 1939 to 1944, the Auckland Electric Power Board from 1944 to 1947, and the Auckland Metropolitan Drainage Board between 1956 and 1957. She was a member of the Auckland City Council (its second woman member) from 1938 to 1944 and again from 1953 to 1961. Her son Alex was also a city councillor from 1953 to 1974.

Dreaver and Mary Anderson were the first two women appointed to the Legislative Council. They were appointed by the First Labour Government in 1946 (after a law change in 1941 to make women eligible); they served to 1950 when the Legislative Council was abolished.

Later life
In the 1946 New Year Honours, Dreaver was appointed a Member of the Order of the British Empire for services in connection with recruiting for the Women's Land Army.

She died in Auckland on 19 July 1961. She was survived by her husband (by only three months), three daughters and two sons.

Notes

References

1887 births
1961 deaths
New Zealand Labour Party MPs
Members of the New Zealand House of Representatives
Members of the New Zealand Legislative Council
New Zealand broadcasters
Local politicians in New Zealand
Women members of the New Zealand House of Representatives
New Zealand Labour Party MLCs
New Zealand MPs for Auckland electorates
New Zealand Members of the Order of the British Empire
Politicians from Dunedin
Unsuccessful candidates in the 1943 New Zealand general election
Unsuccessful candidates in the 1938 New Zealand general election
20th-century New Zealand women politicians
Women members of the New Zealand Legislative Council
Auckland City Councillors
20th-century New Zealand politicians
Members of district health boards in New Zealand
20th-century New Zealand journalists